Morphological analysis is the analysis of morphology in various fields

 Morphological analysis (problem-solving) or general morphological analysis, a method for exploring all possible solutions to a multi-dimensional, non-quantified problem
 Analysis of morphology (linguistics), the internal structure of words. Morphological parsing is conducted by computers to extract morphological information from a given wordform.
 Analysis of morphology (biology), the form and structure of organisms and their specific features
 Mathematical morphology, a theory and technique for analysis and processing of images and geometrical structures
 Morphological dictionary, in computational linguistics, a linguistic resource that contains correspondences between surface form and lexical forms of words